Steven Mark Edgington is an Australian politician from the Northern Territory.

Edgington moved to Darwin in 1988 to join the police force. In his time in the Territory he has lived and worked in a number of locations including senior police roles in Tennant Creek.

|}

Edgington became mayor of Barkly Regional Council, a position he held at the time of the election. He took the controversial and legal grey position that he could run for parliament while concurrently holding the position of mayor.

Edgington was a candidate in the 2020 Northern Territory general election for the seat of Barkly for the Country Liberal Party. While he was behind for most of the count after the election, he made up ground due to the postal votes, and won the seat by a margin of 5 votes.

References

Living people
Members of the Northern Territory Legislative Assembly
Country Liberal Party members of the Northern Territory Legislative Assembly
21st-century Australian politicians
Year of birth missing (living people)